Hannibal Lafayette Godwin (November 3, 1873 – June 9, 1929) was a Democratic U.S. Congressman from North Carolina between 1907 and 1921.

Education and career 
Born near Dunn in Harnett County, North Carolina, Godwin attended common schools near his home and then Trinity College (later Duke University) in Durham. He studied law at the University of North Carolina at Chapel Hill.

Godwin married Mattie Black Barnes (January 9, 1876 – January 11, 1951), daughter of Hugh and Jennetta (Parker) Barnes, on December 23, 1896, in Harnett County, North Carolina.

After being admitted to the bar in 1896, he practiced in Dunn and was elected Dunn's mayor in 1897. In 1903, Godwin was sent to the North Carolina Senate, and from 1904 to 1906, he sat on the executive committee of the North Carolina Democratic Party.

In 1906, Godwin was first elected to the United States Congress; he would be re-elected six times, serving from March 4, 1907, to March 3, 1921. In Congress, he rose to chair the Committee on Reform in the Civil Service. He lost his congressional race in 1920 and returned to the practice of law in Dunn, where he died in 1929; he is buried in Dunn's Greenwood Cemetery.

External links

1873 births
1929 deaths
Duke University Trinity College of Arts and Sciences alumni
Democratic Party North Carolina state senators
Democratic Party members of the United States House of Representatives from North Carolina